USS LST-896 was an  in the United States Navy. Like many of her class, she was not named and is properly referred to by her hull designation.

LST-896 was laid down on 6 October 1944 at Pittsburgh, Pennsylvania, by the Dravo Corporation; launched on 18 November 1944; sponsored by Mrs. Russell D. Strouse; and commissioned on 20 December 1944.

Service history
Following World War II, LST-896 performed occupation duty in the Far East and saw service in China until early December 1945. She was decommissioned on 3 December 1945 and struck from the Navy list on 3 January 1946. Her typhoon-damaged hulk was destroyed on 8 March 1946.

References

 

LST-542-class tank landing ships
World War II amphibious warfare vessels of the United States
Ships built in Pittsburgh
1944 ships
Ships built by Dravo Corporation